Euphoric Sad Songs is the debut mini-album by British singer-songwriter Raye. It was released on 20 November 2020 through Polydor Records. The album was supported by the singles; "Love Me Again", "Secrets" with Regard, "Natalie Don't", "Love of Your life" and "Regardless" with Rudimental. Promotional single "Please Don't Touch" also preceded the project's release. A remix EP titled Euphoric Sad Songs (Dance Edition) was released on 28 December 2020.

Release and promotion 
In an interview with BBC News in July 2020, Raye initially announced that her fifth EP would be titled, Her Heart Beats in 4/4, and that it would be released later that same year, with the project would be centred around the theme of the "seven stages of grief". Raye disclosed that she wrote the album during each stage of grief and that ultimately the creative process had healed her broken heart. It was also confirmed that the EP would include previously released singles "Love Me Again" and "Please Don't Touch". The album would later be re-titled Euphoric Sad Songs, with it being nine tracks in length. Raye would take to her social medias to announce that she will be hosting a Zoom call on 19 November 2020. The project was officially released on 20 November 2020 alongside its release. On 17 December 2020, MTV premiered a mini documentary which mainly focuses about the process and creation of the album.

Singles 
In August 2019, Raye released the lead single "Love Me Again". A remix of the song with Jess Glynne was later released on 30 August 2019. The single peaked at Number 55 on the UK Singles Chart and has since been certified Silver.

"Secrets" with Regard was released as the second single on 24 April 2020. The single achieved commercial success in Europe, as well as reaching the top 10 on the US Billboard Dance/Electronic Songs chart. In the United Kingdom, the song peaked at number 6 on the UK Singles Chart and topped the UK Dance Chart, as well as later being certified Gold.

"Natalie Don't" was released as the third single on 10 July 2020 and would top the Russian Airplay chart as well as peak at number 35 in Scotland.

"Love of Your Life" was released as the fourth single on 6 November 2020. A music video for the song was premiered on Glamour Magazine's website on 12 November 2020.

"Regardless" with Rudimental was released as the fifth single alongside the release of the album on 20 November 2020. A music video was released on January 8, 2021.

Promotional singles
"Please Don't Touch", was released on 13 December 2019 as a promotional single.

Track listing

Charts

Release history

Euphoric Sad Songs (Dance Edition) 

Euphoric Sad Songs (Dance Edition) is the first remix EP and fifth overall from British singer-songwriter Raye. The EP was released on 28 December 2020 through Polydor with no prior announcement. The EP features the single "Regardless" and 3 remixes of tracks from the original album. A reissue of the EP was later released in 2021 and includes 2 new remixes of "Love Of Your Life" as well as 3 new remixes of "Regardless".

References 

Raye (singer) albums
Contemporary R&B EPs
Polydor Records EPs
2020 EPs
Albums produced by TMS (production team)
Dance-pop EPs